Dennehof is a settlement in Overberg District Municipality in the Western Cape province of South Africa.

References

Populated places in the Theewaterskloof Local Municipality